Arphia sulphurea, known generally as sulphur-winged grasshopper, is a species of band-winged grasshopper in the family Acrididae. Other common names include the spring yellow-winged locust and spring yellow-winged grasshopper. It is found in North America.

References

External links

 

Oedipodinae
Articles created by Qbugbot
Insects described in 1781